Philippe Brunel (born 28 February 1973) is a French former professional footballer who played as a midfielder. He was a midfielder or playmaker with a wide range of passing.

Career

Lens
Brunel began his career at RC Lens in 1991. From then until 1995, he made 27 appearances for the club, scoring one goal before moving to FC Gueugnon on a year-long loan in 1995. He made 34 appearances and scored 4 goals for Gueugnon; upon the completion of his loan, he returned to Lens.

Upon his return, Brunel featured much more prominently in the Lens squad; over five years from 1996 to 2001, he played 131 times and scored 8 goals in Ligue 1. He contributed 33 appearances as his side won 1997–98 French Division 1. The following season he played as a substitute in the final as they won the 1998-99 Coupe de la Ligue. He also featured in the club's UEFA Cup campaign in the 1999–2000 season, making two appearances - a 1–2 defeat to 1. FC Kaiserslautern on 25 November 1999 in the home leg of the 3rd-round tie, and the 1–4 victory in the away leg.

Marseille
Brunel's performances for Lens earned him a free transfer in 2001 to Olympique de Marseille, however as with his time at Gueugnon his Marseille career did not go to plan; having made only 11 appearances for his new club, he was transferred in January 2002 to Lille for £880,000.

Lille
During the second half of the season, Brunel made a further 11 appearances for Lille, scoring once, in addition to two appearances in the UEFA Cup - both legs of the last-16 tie with Borussia Dortmund on 21 and 28 February 2002.

From then until 2005, he would make a total of 118 appearances for Lille and score 16 goals in the process; in 2005 he was transferred to Sochaux, however he made only 28 appearances in two years with the club before leaving for Angers SCO in 2007. While at Sochaux he played as a substitute as they won the 2007 Coupe de France Final. The game finished 2-2 and went to penalties, and Brunel scored his penalty in the shootout as his side emerged victorious.

Angers
Over four years with Angers, Brunel scored 10 goals in a total of 99 league appearances in Ligue 2; having featured regularly until 2010 but not made a single appearance in the 2010–11 season, he retired from professional football and moved into amateur football with AS Valence in the summer of 2011.

Career statistics

Honours
Lens
Division 1: 1997–98
Coupe de la Ligue: 1998–99

Lille
UEFA Intertoto Cup: 2004

Sochaux
Coupe de France: 2006–07

References

External links
 
 

1973 births
Living people
Association football midfielders
French footballers
Ligue 1 players
Ligue 2 players
Championnat National 3 players
RC Lens players
FC Gueugnon players
Olympique de Marseille players
Lille OSC players
FC Sochaux-Montbéliard players
Angers SCO players